The 2022 Nadeshiko League was the 34th season of the Nadeshiko League, the second or third-tier leagues for women's association football in Japan. It was also the 18th season in its current format.

Teams

Division 1

Division 2

League table

Top scorers

Division 1

Division 2

See also
Japan Football Association (JFA)
2022 in Japanese football
2021–22 WE League season

References

External links
Official website 

Nadeshiko League seasons
2–3
L